Gordon Bowker is an American entrepreneur. He began as a writer and went on to co-found Starbucks with Jerry Baldwin and Zev Siegl. He was later a co-owner of Peet's Coffee & Tea and Redhook Ale Brewery.

Biography
Following the death of his father in World War II, Bowker was raised by his mother Hazel Ringseth Bowser (1915-1991) in Ballard and Burien, Washington. His grandparents were Norwegian immigrants who took part in the Alaskan Gold Rush. He graduated from O'Dea High School in Seattle. From 1960 to 1965, Bowker attended the University of San Francisco, where he was roommates with Baldwin. Bowker dropped out eight credits away from graduation.

In 1968, Bowker wrote educational film scripts for a division of King Broadcasting while making freelance contributions for Seattle magazine. There he met Terry Heckler and the pair formed advertising agency Heckler Bowker. Bowker met David Brewster at the magazine, years later funding the launch of Brewster's Seattle Weekly and writing restaurant and hospitality reviews under the pen name Lars Henry Ringseth. 

In 1971, Bowker, Baldwin and Siegl opened the first Starbucks near Pike Place Market. In 1984, Starbucks acquired Peet's Coffee & Tea. In 1987, Bowker and Baldwin sold Starbucks to Howard Schultz and a group of investors. Bowker then left the coffee business but later served on Peet's board of directors from 1994 to 2008.

References

Businesspeople in coffee
Living people
Place of birth missing (living people)
Starbucks people
University of San Francisco alumni
Year of birth missing (living people)
American food company founders
Directors of Starbucks